Yang Kun (born 18 December 1972) is a Chinese singer-songwriter. He was one of the judges of TV talent show The Voice of China during the first season and third season of the show. He was on the first season of Sing My Song and was a contestant as one of the seven initial singers on Singer 2019 finishing fourth place.

Career

Early years
Yang Kun joined Baotou Steel Company art troupe in 1989. In 1993 Yang went to Beijing to start his musical career. He signed a contract with the record label, Beijing Culture Development. With that company, he released his first album (Indifferent), which turned him into a popular singer. From then on, Yang Kun started being widely known by his husky voice and his melancholic songs. Sadness and aimlessness are some of the emotions that can be found in Yang Kun's songs, which are mostly inspired by his own life experiences.

In 2003, the singer released his second album, entitled That Day, this release was known by the song "The moon represents my heart", in reference to the song of the same name by Teresa Teng, which was a great hit in China. The song also showed Yang's ability to sing love ballads apart from his previous songs. The same year, Yang Kun was priced for first time with a silver medal in the Eastern Billboard Awards ceremony in the category of "Best original song", for his track "Indifferent".

In 2004, Yang, started expanding his influence to other branches of entertainment debuting for first time as an actor in the indie film 13 Months, which was not very successful. In fact, this film has never been released for unknown reasons. Anyway, the popularity of the singer kept on rising and was awarded, once again, in the Eastern Billboard Awards, this time in the category of Most popular Mainland Chinese Male singer.

The third album by Yang Kun, which had the title of 2008, was released in 2005. It had a Pop-Rock style, similar to his previous works, although, this time, the singer incorporated ethnic instruments, and vocals from Inner Mongolia, the region where he was born. Although the sales of this album and his concerts were successful, the singer was not comfortable enough with his record label. That fact also coincided with many personal problems in the life of the performer, who suffered from depression.

New projects and as a judge
After recovering from his depression, two years later, Yang Kun released his fourth release, Cowboy, under Huayi Brothers. This album was considered by the singer as introspective, with all the songs talking about his recent life and how he tried to find himself. This album was highly promoted by his new company, and many concerts and promotional events for this release were made. During this time, he became friends with new collaborators such as Na Ying and David Huang.

Two years later, in 2009, the performer released a new album featuring a track that is now one of his best-known songs, "Empty city". The popularity of this track was widespread, to the point that has been viewed by over two million users in YouTube. Apart from his usual activities as a singer, Yang Kun not only started appearing in many shows and programmes, but he also returned to the film industry, after an unsuccessful attempt seven years before. In 2011, Yang took part in the film Lost in Panic Cruise, directed by Zhang Fangfang; the movie was a highly successful psychological thriller both critically and commercially. Yang Kun recorded Hui Bu Hui, the theme song for Lost in Panic Cruise.

In 2012, Yang Kun released a new album with the title of I Really Care and took part in the crime thriller movie Lethal Hostage, where he played a drug smuggler.

In July, he became one of the coaches of The Voice of China (now renamed and rebranded to Sing! China), a popular TV show with millions of viewers. During the show's blind auditions, if more than one judge turned alongside Yang Kun, he would try to persuade the contestant to pick himself by telling the contestant that he was holding a concert with 33 stops and that if the contestant picked Yang Kun, the contestant would be invited to come and perform as an additional special guest at the concert. Two years later, he returned to The Voice of China (season 3) once again as a coach with his chosen finalist placing third overall in the competition.

In 2013, he became the host of The Most Beautiful Harmony in the first season and two years later became a coach of the show in season 3.

In 2015, the singer was signed to TH Entertainment, a record label on the rise, where he has been releasing his new songs.

In 2016, Yang Kun was a judge and mentor of Chinese singing competition The Next with Karen Mok, Fei Yu-ching and Hua Chenyu in season 1 along with the addition of Jason Zhang in 2017 for season 2 with his finalists becoming 2nd overall in both seasons.

2019: Participation On Singer 2019
In 2019, Yang Kun returned to television as a contestant on Hunan TV's long-running singing competition Singer 2019 (called I Am a Singer before 2017) along with Liu Huan, Chyi Yu, Wu Tsing-fong, Escape Plan, Zhang Xin and Kristian Kostov as the first seven starting lineup singers where Yang Kun finished fourth in the finals.

Awards

Discography and Musical Work

Albums
 Indifferent (2001)
 That Day (2003)
 2008 (2005)
 Cowboy (2007)
 Yang Kun (2009)
 Disco (2010)
 I Really Care (2012)
 20 Years Old Tonight (2014)
 Lonely 颂 (2017)
 Beautiful Story (2020)

EP's
 EP: Fast Gunner (July 2013)
 EP: I Am Not As Strong As You Think (September 2013)
 EP: Life Like Stone (November 2013)
 EP: Answer (Spring Festival Evening Duet With Amber Kuo) (January 2014)
 EP: Someone (Cover of  Sing My Song Participant Du Qiu's works) (March 2014)
 EP: 20 Years Old Tonight (Sing My Song) (March 2014)
 EP: "Want To Die, Must Die In Your Hands (August 5, 2014)
 EP: Ten Thousand Women (August 20, 2014)
 EP: Save Me Quickly (September 2, 2014)
 EP: The River of Endlessness (October 10, 2016)
 EP: Come Home With Me (November 11, 2016)
 EP: Decorate and Hang Colours (Hua Chenyu Rap) (January 9, 2017)
 EP: Stray Dogs Also Have Homesickness (August 17, 2017)

Filmography 
 13 Months (2004) (never released)
 Lost in Panic Cruise (2011)
 Lethal Hostage (2012)
 The Heart (2019)

Variety Shows

References

External links 

 Yang Kun's Weibo profile

1972 births
Living people
20th-century Chinese  male singers
Chinese Mandopop singers
Mandopop singer-songwriters
Mandarin-language singers
People from Baotou
Singers from Inner Mongolia
Musicians from Inner Mongolia
21st-century Chinese male singers